Kibar Feyzo is a 1978 Turkısh and Kurdish comedy film directed by Atıf Yılmaz.

Plot 
The film takes place in a feudal village in Southeastern Turkey in 1970s. Feyzo, a poor peasant, returns from military service dreaming about marrying Gülo, the love of his life. However, he has to face many obstacles. According to tradition, a man has to pay a lot of money to the bride's father in order to get the bride's hand. While Feyzo is trying to deal with the greed of Gülo's father, who is asking for an astronomical amount of money, he has to also convince his mother, who wants to buy an ox instead of a bride. Feyzo overcomes all these difficulties, but he gets kicked out of the village on his wedding day by the landlord, Maho Aga, who is eager to protect his status against any threat. However, Feyzo goes to the big city on exile only to bring back more problems for Maho.

Cast 
 Kemal Sunal - Feyzo
 Şener Şen - Maho Ağa
 İlyas Salman - Bilo
 Adile Naşit - Sakine
 Müjde Ar - Gülo
 İhsan Yüce - Hacı Hüso

References

External links 

1978 films
1978 comedy films
Courtroom films
Films set in Turkey
Films shot in Turkey
Turkish comedy films